St. James the Apostle College is a private Catholic primary and secondary school, located in Vigo, Pontevedra, in the autonomous region of Galicia, in northwestern Spain. The school was founded by the Society of Jesus in 1872. 

The school currently has 1,485 students in the different educational stages from infant through baccalaureate.

See also

 Catholic Church in Spain
 Education in Spain
 List of Jesuit schools

References  

Jesuit secondary schools in Spain
Jesuit primary schools in Spain
Education in Galicia (Spain)
Buildings and structures in Pontevedra
Educational institutions established in 1872
1872 establishments in Spain